Luine may refer to:

 Leyny, County Sligo, Ireland, a barony (Luíne in Irish)
 Victoria Luine, professor in the Department of Psychology, City University of New York